

Early appearances
Before Ambush Bug received his own mini-series, he appeared in DC Comics Presents #52 and #59 as a villain, later becoming a hero in Supergirl #16. He discovered that Clark Kent is really Superman in Action Comics #560; revealed his origin in issue #563; and in issue #565, tried (and failed) to get Batman, Superman, the Teen Titans, and Wonder Woman to appear in his mini-series. In DC Comics Presents #81 (his last pre-series appearance), he switches bodies with Superman for 48 hours.

Ambush Bug (mini-series)
In this series, Ambush Bug battles bombers that "killed" his sidekick Cheeks in issue #1. He then turned Quentin Quantis (in mutated form) human again in issue #2. In issue #3, he talked about lesser known characters and, in issue #4, had his showdown with Darkseid. In the last issue, he meets Argh! Yle!

Characters

Issue 1
 Ambush Bug
 Cheeks, the Toy Wonder
 Unnamed bombers
 Guardian Angel
 Darkseid

Issue 2
 Ambush Bug
 Orton
 Quentin Quantis
 Two scientists Quentin swallowed
 Darkseid

Issue 3
 Ambush Bug
 Egg Fu
 Wonder Tot
 Blinky
 Super Turtle
 Quisp
 Legion of Super-Pets
 Green Team
 Cheeks, the Toy Wonder
 The Viuarium being
 Bat-Mite
 Cryll
 Doodle Duck
 Inferior Five
 Ace the Bat-Hound
 Mopee
 Bizarro Ambush Bug
 Unnamed blob
 Jonni DC
 Darkseid

Issue 4
 Ambush Bug
 Darkseid

Issue 5
 Ambush Bug
 Argh! Yle!

Ambush Bug Stocking Stuffer
In this one-shot, Ambush Bug's toy sidekick turns into a cannibal zombie, so it is up to Ambush Bug to stop him.

Characters
 Ambush Bug
 Cheecks, the Toy Wonder
 Jonni DC

Son of Ambush Bug
In this second mini-series, Ambush Bug tries to stop the Interferer (a former comic book writer with god-like powers) before being sent to court for "contempt of comics". He is then kicked out of the DC Universe.

Characters
 Ambush Bug
 Cheecks, the Toy Wonder
 Argh! Yle!
 The Uh-Oh Squad
 The Interferer
 Two-Face

Post-Son of Ambush Bug
Despite the end of the Son of Ambush Bug series, Ambush Bug reappears in Secret Origin #48, where he refuses to reveal his origins.

Ambush Bug: Year None

Showcase Presents Ambush Bug
In 2009, DC Comics released a black-and-white, 478-page collection of comics featuring Ambush Bug.

Ambush Bug